Benjamin Leon, Jr. is a Cuban-American businessman and horse enthusiast.

Career
Leon was born in Oriente, Cuba in 1944. Leon migrated to Miami, Florida in 1961. Leon's father founded Clinica Cuba in 1964 in order to help meet the healthcare needs of newly immigrated Cubans. Leon and his father also founded Clínica Asociación Cubana (CAC), one of the first health maintenance organizations in the United States. In 1994, Leon sold CAC to UnitedHealthCare for $500 million. In 1996, Leon founded Leon Medical Centers, which provides healthcare to Medicare patients. Leon Medical Centers is currently led by Leon's son, Benjamin Leon III, who serves as the company's CEO.

Besilu Stables
In the 1980s, Leon established Besilu Stables, and began to show and breed Paso Fino horses. In 2008, Leon bought his first Thoroughbred, and soon after started racing horses. In 2011, Leon bought Royal Delta for $8.5 million. She would win the Eclipse Award for American Champion Three-Year-Old Filly in 2011 and again in 2012 and 2013 as the American Champion Older Dirt Female Horse.

Political activity and philanthropy
In 2015, Leon donated $2.5 million to the presidential campaign of Marco Rubio. Leon has also donated to the Republican Party of Kentucky and Mitch McConnell.

In 2008, Leon donated $10 million to establish the Florida International University Family Center for Geriatrics Research and Education.

References

Living people
1944 births
Businesspeople from Miami
Cuban emigrants to the United States
Florida Republicans